Dawid Husselman, better known as Hakkies Husselman (born 3 November 1972), is a Namibian rugby union former international player and a current coach. He played as a scrum-half.

Career

Player
He played for Western Province in South Africa. His first match for Namibia was at 3 July 1993, with AGRU, in a 64-20 win.

Husselman was present at the 2003 Rugby World Cup finals, playing three games. He had 10 caps for his country, with 4 tries scored, 20 points in aggregate.

Coach
He latter became a coach, and was nominated coach of Namibia at 27 June 2007, for the 2007 Rugby World Cup finals. Namibia lost all four games, but did a convincing performance at the 17-32 loss to Ireland. He applied to remain in office after the World Cup but was dismissed.

Notes

1972 births
Living people
White Namibian people
Namibian rugby union players
Namibian rugby union coaches
Rugby union scrum-halves
Namibian expatriate rugby union players
Expatriate rugby union players in South Africa
Namibian expatriate sportspeople in South Africa
Namibia international rugby union players